Love in a Mist is a 1941 comedy play by the British writer Kenneth Horne. The plot around a honeymooning couple at an isolated cottage on Exmoor.

It premiered at the Connaught Theatre in Worthing. It then transferred to St Martin's Theatre in the West End, enjoying a run of 91 performances between 20 November 1941 and 7 February 1942. The cast included Ann Todd, Anna Konstam, Richard Bird, Michael Shepley and Marjorie Rhodes.

References

Bibliography
 Wearing, J.P. The London Stage 1940-1949: A Calendar of Productions, Performers, and Personnel.  Rowman & Littlefield, 2014.

1941 plays
Plays by Kenneth Horne
West End plays
Comedy plays
Plays set in England